The March of Dimes Trot was a Standardbredtrotting race that took place at Garden State Park Racetrack in New Jersey on November 17, 1988. It is considered one of the most legendary races in trotting history. The race was connected with March of Dimes charity foundation.

The idea of the race was a duel between American world-record-breaker Mack Lobell, who had just been sold to Sweden, and the famous French trotter Ourasi. Both horses had been racing in Europe but they had never met. The one-mile race also featured eight other horses from Europe and North America. Three of the European participants (Napoletano, Sugarcane Hanover and Friendly Face) were American-bred.

The race evoked great interest in Europe. More than 70 reporters had flown to cover the race. A four-hour television coverage was sent to France and the race was also broadcast in Sweden. Surprisingly only a crowd of 8,000 people showed up at the racetrack. Hundreds of them were from Europe.

Winner of the March of Dimes Trot was an American expatriate Sugarcane Hanover who was trained in Norway. Ourasi finished second and Mack Lobell who took the lead was third.

Results

1 Country of the owner

References

Harness races in the United States
Discontinued harness races
1988 in sports in New Jersey
1988 in horse racing